Ten ships and one shore establishment of the British Royal Navy have been named HMS Hornet, after the insect:

 , a 14-gun sloop launched in 1745.  She was in French hands between 1746 and 1747, and was sold in 1770.
 , a 16-gun cutter purchased in 1763 and sold in 1772.
 , a 14-gun sloop launched in 1776 and sold in 1791.
 , a 16-gun sloop launched in 1794, hospital ship from 1805 to 1811, and sold in 1817.
 , a 4-gun Dutch hoy purchased as a gunvessel in 1794 and broken up in 1795.
 , a 6-gun schooner launched in 1831 and completed as a brigantine.  She was broken up in 1845.
 , a wooden  screw sloop, initially ordered as a schooner, launched in 1854 and broken up in 1868.
 , a composite  screw gunvessel launched in 1868 and sold in 1899. 
 , a  launched in 1893 and broken up in 1909.
 , an  launched in 1911 and broken up in 1921.
 , a stone frigate, a Coastal Forces Base at Gosport formed around 1941 and disbanded in 1956.

Royal Navy ship names